Damned Soul is a marble sculpture bust by the Italian artist Gian Lorenzo Bernini as a pendant piece to his Blessed Soul. According to Rudolf Wittkower, the sculpture is in the Palazzo di Spagna in Rome. This may well be what is known today as the Palazzo Monaldeschi.

There is a bronze copy, executed by Massimiliano Soldani Benzi some time between 1705 and 1707, in the Liechtenstein Collection.

Recent scholarship on the sculpture has queried whether its topic is not the Christian personifications of pain (possibly inspired by prints by Karel van Mallery), but a depiction of a satyr.

See also
List of works by Gian Lorenzo Bernini

Notes

References

External links

1620s sculptures
Busts in Italy
Marble sculptures in Italy
Busts by Gian Lorenzo Bernini
Bronze sculptures in Austria
Sculptures in Rome
Sculptures of men